Tacheocampylaea raspailii is a species of air-breathing land snail, a terrestrial pulmonate gastropod mollusk in the family Helicidae. This species is endemic to Corsica, France.

This name has been sometimes used, incorrectly, in the scientific literature to refer to any of the 27 names that have been given to species of Corsican molluscs in the genus Tacheocampylaea.

References

Tacheocampylaea
Gastropods described in 1826
Endemic molluscs of Metropolitan France
Molluscs of Europe
Endemic fauna of Corsica
Taxonomy articles created by Polbot